Ireland was represented by Tina Reynolds, with the song "Cross Your Heart", at the 1974 Eurovision Song Contest, which took place on 6 April in Brighton, England. "Cross Your Heart" was chosen as the Irish entry at the national final on 9 February.

For the first time since joining Eurovision in 1965, broadcaster RTÉ pre-selected Reynolds as their performer rather than holding a multi-artist selection. It is generally believed that this was in acknowledgement of Reynolds' co-operation with RTÉ during the well-publicised controversies and disagreements which had dogged Ireland's Eurovision participation in 1973.

Before Eurovision

National final 
The final was held at the RTÉ studios in Dublin, hosted by Mike Murphy. Reynolds performed eight songs, with the winner chosen by postcard voting.

Irish Army soldiers were stationed outside the studio after a bomb threat was called in to RTÉ seven minutes before the show, which took place during the most violent period of The Troubles. Four more bomb threats were called in during the programme.

At Eurovision 
On the night of the final Reynolds performed 13th in the running order, following the Netherlands and preceding Germany. At the close of voting "Cross Your Heart" had picked up 11 points, placing Ireland joint 7th (with Israel) of the 17 entries.

Voting

References 

1974
Countries in the Eurovision Song Contest 1974
Eurovision
Eurovision